Lamellodynerus is an Afrotropical genus of potter wasps with a single species Lamellodynerus nigrofulvus from the Ivory Coast.

References

Endemic fauna of Ivory Coast
Potter wasps
Monotypic Hymenoptera genera